Penn Farm of the Trustees of the New Castle Common also known as Penn Farm and Farm No. 7, is a historic farm complex located near New Castle, New Castle County, Delaware. The complex includes a farmhouse, bank barn, granary, milk house, carriage shed, tenant shack, garage, chicken house, and vegetable stand.  The farmhouse was built about 1804, and consists of a two-story, three-bay brick section; a two-story, four-bay frame section; and a one-story frame shed.

It was added to the National Register of Historic Places in 1997.

The Penn Farm Trail is a part of the East Coast Greenway.

References

Farms on the National Register of Historic Places in Delaware
Houses completed in 1804
Houses in New Castle, Delaware
National Register of Historic Places in New Castle County, Delaware